Gephyroberyx is a genus of fish in the slimehead family.

Species
Once, three species were placed in this genus, but Gephyroberyx philippinus is now considered to be a synonym of G. darwinii. Based on broadly overlapping morphological features, G. japonicus should also be regarded a synonym of G. darwinii, but both are recognized as valid species by FishBase:

 Gephyroberyx darwinii (J. Y. Johnson, 1866) (Darwin's slimehead)
 Gephyroberyx japonicus (Döderlein, 1883) (big roughy)

References

Trachichthyidae
Taxa named by George Albert Boulenger
Marine fish genera